The Prancing Elites Project is an American reality television series that premiered on April 22, 2015, on Oxygen. Announced in September 2014, the series follows a five-member dance team as they juggle their personal and professional lives in Mobile, Alabama. The cast members include Adrian Clemons, Kentrell Collins, Kareem Davis, Jerel Maddox and Tim Smith. The dance team is described by the network as "the African American, gay and gender non-conforming."

The show was subsequently renewed for a second season, which premiered on January 19, 2016. However, the show has been canceled and will not return after the summer of 2017 according to Oxygen TV.

Cast 
 Kentrell Collins (Season 1 - 2)
 Kareem Davis (Season 1 - 2)
 Jerel Maddox (Season 1 - 2)
 Tim Smith (Season 1 - 2)
 Adrian Clemons (Season 1 - 2)

Episodes

See also

 J-Setting

References

External links 
 
 
 

2010s American reality television series
2015 American television series debuts
English-language television shows
Oxygen (TV channel) original programming
Television shows set in Alabama
American LGBT-related reality television series
LGBT African-American culture
2010s LGBT-related reality television series